This is a list of notable dog trainers. 

 Francis Butler was a veterinarian and author who specialised in the training and control of dogs in the 1800s.
 Anne Rogers Clark, co-author of The International Encyclopedia of Dogs and first woman to win best in show at Westminster as a professional handler
 Ian Dunbar, a veterinarian, dog trainer, and writer
 Tamar Geller, developer of "the Loved Dog" method of dog training
 Frank Inn, professional animal trainer who worked with the dogs in the Benji series
 Bonnie Judd, professional animal trainer who worked with the dogs on Air Bud: World Pup, Good Boy!, and A Dog's Journey.
 Brian Kilcommons, author of pet training manuals and winner of Dr. Steve Kritsick Memorial Award from the New York State Veterinary Medical Society
 Patricia McConnell, author and former adjunct Professor of Zoology at the University of Wisconsin-Madison
Pat Miller, book author and training editor at Whole Dog Journal
 Karen Pryor, founder of clicker training
 Blanche Saunders was famous for her 10,000 mile tour across USA to demonstrate dog obedience and training. She published several books on dog training.
 Bernard Waters, dog trainer and author about sporting dogs
 Barbara Woodhouse was a dog breeder and trainer in England, known for her philosophy "There are no bad dogs, just inexperienced owners." She authored several books on dog training, and hosted a 1980s BBC TV series about training your own dog.
 Sophia Yin, veterinarian, applied animal behaviorist, author and lecturer

Celebrity, performing and media-based dog trainers
 Graeme Hall star of Dogs Behaving (Very) Badly on Channel 5
 Steve Austin, judge on the Network Ten series Celebrity Dog School
 John Garcia, star of National Geographic Channel's DogTown series, trainer for Best Friends Animal Society
 Brandon McMillan (animal trainer) Animal Trainer and Behaviorist, Service Dog Trainer, former host of the Emmy winning series Lucky Dog on CBS
 Cesar Millan, Dog Behaviourist and Celebrity Dog Trainer, star on the National Geographic Channel series Dog Whisperer
 Joel Silverman, Hollywood dog trainer, author and star of Animal Planet's GOOD DOG U; star of WHAT COLOR IS YOUR DOG?
 Victoria Stilwell, host of Channel 4 series It's Me or the Dog and judge on the CBS show Greatest American Dog
 Kyra Sundance, stunt dog performer and author of the book 101 Dog Tricks
 Nick White, dog trainer and author
 Sherry Woodard, star of National Geographic Channel's DogTown series, certified dog trainer and animal behaviorist

References

See also 
 Dog behaviourist
 Dog training

 
Lists of people by occupation